Upham is a city in McHenry County, North Dakota, United States. The population was 135 at the 2020 census. It is part of the Minot Micropolitan Statistical Area. Upham was founded in 1905.

Geography
Upham is located at  (48.581211, -100.727082).

Demographics

The Mayor of Upham, North Dakota is Steve Plorin.

2010 census
As of the census of 2010, there were 130 people, 67 households, and 36 families residing in the city. The racial makeup of the city was 96.2% White, 0.8% African American, 0.8% Native American, 0.8% Asian, and 1.5% from two or more races.

There were 67 households, of which 20.9% had children under the age of 18 living with them, 37.3% were married couples living together, 7.5% had a female householder with no husband present, 9.0% had a male householder with no wife present, and 46.3% were non-families. 40.3% of all households were made up of individuals, and 13.4% had someone living alone who was 65 years of age or older. The average household size was 1.94 and the average family size was 2.56.

The median age in the city was 47 years. 18.5% of residents were under the age of 18; 6.1% were between the ages of 18 and 24; 23% were from 25 to 44; 33.9% were from 45 to 64; and 18.5% were 65 years of age or older. The gender makeup of the city was 55.4% male and 44.6% female.

2000 census
As of the census of 2000, there were 155 people, 81 households, and 40 families residing in the city. The population density was 479.4 people per square mile (187.0/km). There were 120 housing units at an average density of 371.1 per square mile (144.8/km). The racial makeup of the city was 98.71% White, and 1.29% from two or more races.

There were 81 households, out of which 22.2% had children under the age of 18 living with them, 38.3% were married couples living together, 7.4% had a female householder with no husband present, and 50.6% were non-families. 48.1% of all households were made up of individuals, and 28.4% had someone living alone who was 65 years of age or older. The average household size was 1.91 and the average family size was 2.78.

In the city, the population was spread out, with 20.0% under the age of 18, 5.8% from 18 to 24, 25.8% from 25 to 44, 20.0% from 45 to 64, and 28.4% who were 65 years of age or older. The median age was 44 years. For every 100 females, there were 109.5 males. For every 100 females age 18 and over, there were 96.8 males.

The median income for a household in the city was $21,250, and the median income for a family was $31,458. Males had a median income of $23,750 versus $18,750 for females. The per capita income for the city was $11,187. About 15.1% of families and 24.7% of the population were below the poverty line, including 26.1% of those under the age of eighteen and 29.5% of those 65 or over.

Climate
This climatic region is typified by large seasonal temperature differences, with warm to hot (and often humid) summers and cold (sometimes severely cold) winters.  According to the Köppen Climate Classification system, Upham has a humid continental climate, abbreviated "Dfb" on climate maps.

References

External links
A brief history of Bloomfield Lutheran Church : published on the occasion of the fiftieth anniversary of its organization (1950) from the Digital Horizons website

Cities in McHenry County, North Dakota
Cities in North Dakota
Populated places established in 1905
1905 establishments in North Dakota
Minot, North Dakota micropolitan area